This List of Palestinian records lists  international records achieved by people, groups, or institutions from the Palestinian territories.

C

Cable Car

The longest cable car below Sea Level is located in Jericho. The cable car has 12 cabins with an eight-person capacity each, for a total carrying capacity of 625 persons per hour.

K

Kites 
On 29 July 2010, UNRWA, the United Nations Relief and Works Agency, announced it had broken its former record of flying kites on the coast of Gaza Strip by flying 7202 kites.

Their former record was set on 30 July 2009, by a group of 3,710 children from the Gaza Strip, breaking the previous record set in Germany in 2008.

The record attempt was part of the Summer Games program run by UNRWA and available to young Palestinians during their summer break from school. The event brought some 6,000 campers in orange uniforms and blue caps to a beach in Gaza's war-torn north, where they released their kites into clear skies. Some kites included the red, green, black and white Palestinian flag.

Knafeh
The largest plate of the Palestinian cheese pastry knafeh was reportedly made in 2009 in the West Bank city of Nablus, where knafeh was invented, in an attempt at a Guinness World Record. The plate of Knafeh measured 75 meters in length and two meters in width with a weight of 1,350 kg. However, the attempt was bested by the city of Antakya in Turkey in 2017, with a 78-meter tray of the Turkish version of the dish, known as künefe. Neither attempt was officially listed as breaking the record; according to the website of the Guinness World Records, there is no current record holder for the title.

M

Musakhan
On 20 April 2010, the Palestinians registered a new record with the largest ever dish of Musakhan in Ramallah and entered it into the Guinness Book of World Records.

The total diameter of the 'Musakhan' loaf was 4 meters, with a total weight of 1,350 kg. 40 cooks made use of 250 kg of flour, 170 kg of olive oil, 500 kg of onions and 70 kg of almonds.

Q

Qatayef
The largest Qatayef ever made was baked by the DANA Bakery (Palestine) in an event organized by the Bethlehem Chamber of Commerce and Industry on 27 August 2010. It was cooked by 15 people over the course of three hours.

T

Tabouleh
Nasser Abdulhadi's Ramallah restaurant Zeit wa Zaatar holds the Guinness World Record for the world's largest tabouleh (an Arab salad of chopped parsley, bulgur, onion, tomato, and mint).

References

 
Records
Records